479th may refer to:

479th Antisubmarine Group, inactive United States Air Force unit
479th Bombardment Squadron, inactive United States Air Force unit
479th Field Artillery Brigade (United States), field artillery brigade of the United States Army
479th Flying Training Group, United States Air Force unit, stationed at Naval Air Station Pensacola (NASP)
479th Tactical Training Wing, inactive United States Air Force unit

See also
479 (number)
479, the year 479 (CDLXXIX) of the Julian calendar
479 BC